Muharua Wilhelm 'Max' Katjijeko (born 8 April 1995) is a Namibian rugby union player for the n national team and for the  in the Currie Cup and the Rugby Challenge. His regular position is lock or flanker.

Rugby career

Katjijeko was born in Windhoek.

References

External links
 

1995 births
Living people
Namibia international rugby union players
Namibian rugby union players
Yacare XV players
People educated at Windhoek High School
Rugby union flankers
Rugby union locks
Rugby union players from Windhoek
Welwitschias players
Tel Aviv Heat players
Namibian expatriate rugby union players
Namibian expatriate sportspeople in Israel
Expatriate rugby union players in Israel